The Caribbean Handball Championship is the official competition for Men's and Women's national handball teams of Caribbean. In addition to crowning the Caribbean champions, the tournament also serves as a qualifying tournament for the Central American and Caribbean Games.

Men

Summary

Medal table

Participating nations

Women

Summary

Medal table

Participating nations

References

External links
 www.panamhandball.org

Handball competitions in North America